The West Busway is a two-lane bus-only highway serving the western portions of the city of Pittsburgh and several western suburbs. It broke ground on October 27, 1994 and is owned and maintained by Pittsburgh Regional Transit, the public transit provider for Allegheny County and the Pittsburgh region. The transit thoroughfare was opened in September 2000. Following the naming convention of each busway being designated by a color, bus routes that use the West Busway begin with a "G" for green.

In addition to running along the abandoned railroad right of way, the West Busway also reuses the historic Cork Run Tunnel, also known as the Berry Street Tunnel, which was heavily refurbished for the busway

The Institute for Transportation and Development Policy (ITDP), under its BRT Standard, has classified the West Busway as a "Basic BRT" corridor.

Routes 
Four Pittsburgh Regional Transit bus routes currently serve the West Busway.  One route is the flag carrier of the busway and terminates at the end of the thoroughfare. The G2 West Busway All Stops travels along the end of the busway to West Carson Street, crosses the Fort Pitt Bridge, then makes a loop through Downtown Pittsburgh to connect with the East Busway. Another important route, the 28X Airport Flyer, uses the West Busway as far south as Bell Station; dedicated ramps connect the Busway to Interstate 376. The Airport Flyer has stop restrictions and buses outbound to the Airport will stop only to pick up (no drop offs) passengers south of Ingram station.
Following the naming convention of each busway being designated by a color, bus routes that use the West Busway begin with a "G" for green.

Stations

References

External links 

 Port Authority of Allegheny County information page on the West Busway
G2 – West Busway schedule
28X – Airport Flyer schedule
Phase I Airport Busway/Wabash HOV, Allegheny County, Pennsylvania: Environmental Impact Statement

Port Authority of Allegheny County
Bus rapid transit in Pennsylvania
Busways
Transportation in Pittsburgh